The following outline is provided as an overview of and topical guide to Texas:

Texas – second-most populous and the second-most extensive of the 50 states of the United States of America. Texas borders Mexico and the Gulf of Mexico in the South Central United States. Texas is placed in the Southern United States by the United States Census Bureau.  The Republic of Texas joined the United States as the 28th state on December 29, 1845. Texas joined the Confederate States of America during the American Civil War from 1861 to 1865 but was readmitted to the Union in 1870.

General reference 

 Names
 Common name: Texas
 Pronunciation: 
 Official name: State of Texas
 Abbreviations and name codes
 Postal symbol:  TX
 ISO 3166-2 code:  US-TX
 Internet second-level domain:  .tx.us
 Nicknames
Lone Star State (used on license plates)
 Chili State
 Adjectival: Texas
 Demonyms:
 Texan
 Texian (historical)

Geography of Texas 

Geography of Texas
 Texas is: a U.S. state, a federal state of the United States of America
 Location
 Northern Hemisphere
 Western Hemisphere
 Americas
 North America
 Anglo-America
 Northern America
 United States
 Contiguous United States
 Western United States
 Southwestern United States
 Southern United States
 South Central United States
 Black Belt
 Deep South
 Gulf Coast of the United States
 Population of Texas: 25,145,561  (2010 U.S. Census)
 Area of Texas: 
 Atlas of Texas

Places in Texas 

 Historic places in Texas
 Abandoned communities in Texas
 Ghost towns in Texas
 National Historic Landmarks in Texas
 National Register of Historic Places listings in Texas
 Bridges on the National Register of Historic Places in Texas
 National Natural Landmarks in Texas
 National parks in Texas (2)
 Big Bend National Park
 Guadalupe Mountains National Park
 State parks in Texas

Environment of Texas 

 Climate of Texas
 Climate change in Texas
 Geology of Texas
 Protected areas in Texas
 State forests of Texas
 Superfund sites in Texas
 Save Our Springs Alliance
 Texas Natural Resources Information System
 Wildlife of Texas
 Fauna of Texas
 Birds of Texas
 Mammals of Texas
 Reptiles of Texas
 Butterflies of Texas

Natural geographic features of Texas 

 Islands of Texas
 Lakes of Texas
 Rivers of Texas
 Estuaries of Texas

Regions of Texas 

 Central Texas
 Eastern Texas
 Northern Texas
 Northeastern Texas
 Southern Texas
 Southeastern Texas
 Texas Panhandle
 Texas Gulf Coast
 Western Texas

Administrative divisions of Texas 

 The 254 counties of the state of Texas
 Municipalities in Texas
 Cities in Texas
 State capital of Texas: Austin
 Largest city in Texas: Houston (fourth-largest city in the United States)
 City nicknames in Texas
 Towns in Texas
 Unincorporated communities in Texas

Demography of Texas 

Demographics of Texas

 German Texan
 History of African-Americans in Texas
 History of African Americans in Houston
 History of African Americans in Dallas-Ft. Worth
 History of African Americans in San Antonio
 Jewish history in Texas
 Hispanics and Latinos in Texas
 History of Mexican-Americans in Texas
 History of Mexican Americans in Houston
 History of Mexican Americans in Dallas-Fort Worth

Government and politics of Texas 

 Form of government: U.S. state government
 United States congressional delegations from Texas
 Texas State Capitol
 Elections in Texas
 Electoral reform in Texas
 Political party strength in Texas

Branches of the government of Texas 

Government of Texas

Executive branch of the government of Texas 
 Governor of Texas
 Lieutenant Governor of Texas
 Secretary of State of Texas
 State departments
 List of Texas state agencies
 Texas Commission on Environmental Quality
 Texas Department of Transportation
 Texas Education Agency
 Texas Parks and Wildlife Department

Legislative branch of the government of Texas 

 Texas Legislature (bicameral)
 Upper house: Texas Senate
 Lower house: Texas House of Representatives

Judicial branch of the government of Texas 

Courts of Texas
 Supreme Court of Texas

Law and order in Texas 

Law of Texas
 Cannabis in Texas
 Capital punishment  in Texas
 People executed in Texas
 Constitution of Texas
 Crime in Texas
 Gun laws in Texas
 Law enforcement in Texas
 Law enforcement agencies in Texas
 Texas State Police (1870–1873)
 Texas Highway Patrol
 Texas Ranger Division
 Prisons in Texas

Military in Texas 

Texas Military Forces
 Texas Air National Guard
 Texas Army National Guard
 Texas State Guard

History of Texas 

History of Texas

History of Texas, by period 
Prehistory of Texas
Early Spanish exploration, 1519
French colonization of Texas, 1684–1689
Spanish Texas, as part of the Viceroyalty of New Spain, 1690–1821
History of slavery in Texas
Parts of the current state were also included in the following provinces of New Spain
Nueva Vizcaya, 1577–1821
Santa Fe de Nuevo México, 1598–1821
Nuevo Santander, 1746–1821
Commandancy General of the Provincias Internas
Spanish missions in Texas
French colony of Louisiane, 1699–1764
Treaty of Fontainebleau (1762)
Spanish (though predominantly Francophone) district of Baja Luisiana, 1764–1803
Third Treaty of San Ildefonso of 1800
French district of Basse-Louisiane, 1803
Louisiana Purchase of 1803
Territorial claims of United States Louisiana Purchase, 1803–1821
Sabine Free State, 1806–1821
Adams–Onís Treaty of 1819
Mexican War of Independence, 1810–1821
Gutiérrez–Magee Expedition, 1812–1813
Long Expedition, 1819
Treaty of Córdoba of 1821
Mexican Texas, 1821–1836
The Constitution of Mexico of 1824 created the state Coahuila y Tejas from Spanish Texas and Coahuila.
Parts of the current state of Texas were also included in the following Mexican states
Chihuahua, since 1824
Nuevo León, since 1824
Tamaulipas, since 1824
Santa Fe de Nuevo México, 1824–1848
Coahuila, since 1836
Texas Revolution, 1835–1836
Timeline of the Texas Revolution
Treaties of Velasco, 1836
Texas Declaration of Independence, 1836
Republic of Texas, 1836–1845
Texas–Indian Wars, 1836–1875
Republic of the Rio Grande, 1840
U.S. State of Texas since December 29, 1845
Texas annexation of 1845
Mexican–American War, 1846–1848
Treaty of Guadalupe Hidalgo of 1848
Compromise of 1850
Northwestern territorial claims ceded 1850
Texas in the American Civil War, 1861–1865; part of the Confederate States of America
Texas in Reconstruction, 1865–1870
Comanche Campaign, 1868–1874

History of Texas, by region 
 History of Austin, Texas
 History of Corpus Christi, Texas
 History of Dallas, Texas
 History of El Paso, Texas
 History of Fort Worth, Texas
 History of Galveston, Texas
 History of Houston
 History of Marshall, Texas
 History of San Antonio, Texas
 History of Sugar Land, Texas

History of Texas, by subject 
 History of education in Texas
 History of Texas A&M University
 History of the University of Texas at Austin
 History of Texas Tech University
 History of Texas forests
 History of law enforcement in Texas
 History of the Texas Ranger Division
 History of vice in Texas
 History of religion in Texas
 History of Judaism in Texas
 History of the Jews in Brazos County, Texas
 History of the Jews in Brenham, Texas
 History of the Jews in Dallas, Texas
 History of the Jews in Galveston, Texas
 History of slavery in Texas
 History of sports in Texas
 History of the Houston Astros
 History of the Texas Rangers (baseball)

Culture of Texas 

Culture of Texas
 Museums in Texas
 Religion in Texas
 The Church of Jesus Christ of Latter-day Saints in Texas
 Episcopal Diocese of Texas
 Jewish history in Texas
 Scouting in Texas
 State symbols of Texas
 Flag of Texas
 Seal of Texas
Texas cuisine

The arts in Texas 
 Music of Texas

Sports in Texas 

Sports in Texas

Economy and infrastructure of Texas 

Economy of Texas
 Communications in Texas
 Newspapers in Texas
 Radio stations in Texas
 Television stations in Texas
 Health care in Texas
 Hospitals in Texas
 Transportation in Texas
 Airports in Texas
 Roads in Texas
 U.S. Highways in Texas
 Interstate Highways in Texas
 State highways in Texas

Education in Texas 

Education in Texas
 Schools in Texas
 School districts in Texas
 High schools in Texas
 Private schools in Texas
 Colleges and universities in Texas

See also

Topic overview:
Texas

Index of Texas-related articles

References

External links 

 
Texas
Texas
.